Timothy Charles "Youngblood" Chapman (born May 13, 1965) is  a retired American bounty hunter, known for being one of the stars of A&E TV's Dog the Bounty Hunter, in which he assists Duane "Dog" Chapman track down and capture wanted fugitives.

Personal life and career
Timothy Charles "Youngblood" Chapman, a third generation bondsman, was born in Ventura, California, the son of Ronald Chapman and a Colorado bondswoman, Diane Wimberly, whose slogan was, "Let A Blond Write Your Bond". According to Chapman, he grew up in Ventura, California. His parents separated when he was  years old and he and his brother, Russell J. Chapman, went to live with their paternal grandparents for two years. Tim spent his teenage years living with his mother and with his maternal grandparents, who owned and operated ABC Bail Bonds in Denver. Tim claims to have made his first civilian arrest at the age of 14 years.

During his time working at his mother's bail bond business, Chapman met Duane "Dog" Chapman. Although the two share no blood relation, Dog refers to Tim as his "blood-brother". Later, Tim joined Dog, Dog's long time girlfriend Beth Smith, and Dog's son Leland in Hawaii where they had started the Da Kine Bail Bonds company.

Tim Chapman was a regular cast member for the first five seasons of Dog the Bounty Hunter. Chapman was absent from the show from season six to the April 14, 2010 season seven episode "Mister Mom". Chapman explained that he had taken a break so that he could take care of his four youngest children. He also was dealing with the fallout from his second arrest.

Arrests

First arrest
On September 14, 2006, Tim Chapman was arrested along with Duane "Dog" Chapman and Leland Chapman by U.S. Marshals at the request of the Mexican government, and were to be extradited to Mexico to face charges of "deprivation of liberty". The charges stemmed from an incident where Chapman, Dog, and Leland were chasing fugitive and serial rapist Andrew LusterThey captured Luster on June 18, 2003 in Puerto Vallarta, Mexico. Shortly after the capture, the three were themselves arrested by Puerto Vallarta police officers; the three posted bail but never returned to Mexico for their court hearing on July 15, 2003.

Tim, Dog, and Leland were released from custody on bail; Tim and Leland's bail was set at $100,000 each, while Dog's was set at $300,000. After their release, all three were fitted with electronic bracelets, and were ordered to surrender their passports, and not leave the state of Hawaii. They faced an extradition hearing to Mexico, under the terms of treaties between the United States and Mexico.

On the August 4, 2007 episode of Larry King Live, it was announced that the charges filed against the three bounty hunters had been dropped by the Mexican government. If convicted, the three could have been sentenced to up to four years in prison.

Second arrest
In January 2008, prosecutors charged Tim Chapman with first-degree "terroristic threatening" following an incident at the Ala Moana Center in Honolulu, Hawaii. He was also charged with indecent exposure. Police and prosecutors stated that security guards recognized Chapman from his role of the show Dog the Bounty Hunter when they responded to a report of a man fondling himself in a vehicle at a parking lot around 9 P.M. on January 3, 2008. After a short court case, Chapmen was acquitted and released. This followed a break-up with his partner.

References

External links
 Dog the Bounty Hunter official site
 
 Da Kine Bail Bonds
 A&E Dog the Bounty Hunter TV Show Official Website

Bounty hunters
People from Hawaii
Living people
1965 births